Dion Miles (born 9 August 1978) is a former Australian rules footballer who played with North Melbourne in the Australian Football League (AFL).

Miles played his early football at Chanel College in Geelong and competed for the Western Jets in the TAC Cup.

A midfielder, he played reserves football with North Melbourne in 1997 and won their best and fairest award.

Miles made his debut for the North Melbourne senior side in round 11 of the 1998 AFL season, against Collingwood at the Melbourne Cricket Ground. He had seven disposals and kicked a goal. His only other appearance in the AFL came the following week, in North Melbourne's loss to Richmond at the same ground.

Later that season, Miles injured his knee and had to have a knee reconstruction. He never played another senior game for his club.

Miles coached Ballarat Football League club Bacchus Marsh from 2007 to 2009. He had earlier coached the East Point Football Club.

References

External links
 
 

1978 births
Australian rules footballers from Victoria (Australia)
North Melbourne Football Club players
Western Jets players
Living people
Place of birth missing (living people)